Garske is a surname. Notable people with the surname include:

Charlotte Garske (1906–1943), German political activist
Erich Garske (1907–1943), German political activist

See also 
Garske, North Dakota, is an unincorporated community in Ramsey County, in the U.S. state of North Dakota